Atasu may refer to:
 Atasu, Uttar Pradesh, a town in Uttar Pradesh, India
 Atasu, Kazakhstan, a town in Karagandy Province, Kazakhstan , an endpoint of Kazakhstan-China oil pipeline.